Roof of Africa may refer to:

 Mount Kilimanjaro, the highest mountain in Africa
 Ethiopian Highlands
 A motorcycle rally in Lesotho; see Red Bull Romaniacs Hard Enduro Rallye
 "Roof of Africa", an episode of the TV series Perilous Journeys

See also
 From the Roof of Africa, a 1971 book by C. W. Nicol